Bardzice  is a village in the administrative district of Gmina Kowala, within Radom County, Masovian Voivodeship, in east-central Poland.

The village has a population of 450.

References

Bardzice